Disma Ferrario (29 January 1899 – 3 March 1979) was an Italian male middle-distance runner who competed at the 1924 Summer Olympics,

References

External links
 

1899 births
1979 deaths
Athletes (track and field) at the 1924 Summer Olympics
Italian male middle-distance runners
Olympic athletes of Italy
Athletes from Milan